Lists of Austrian state governors cover the governors, or Landeshauptleute of the states of Austria. The governor is the head of the state government, with a function that is equivalent to that of a premier.

Lists of state

 List of governors of Burgenland
 List of governors of Carinthia
 List of governors of Lower Austria
 List of governors of Salzburg (state)
 List of governors of Styria
 List of governors of Tyrol
 List of governors of Upper Austria
 List of governors of Vorarlberg